Kuzaran (also Romanized as Kūzarān; also known as Kūzarān-e Sanjābī) is a city and capital of Kuzaran District, in Kermanshah County, Kermanshah Province, Iran.  At the 2006 census, its population was 3,759, in 810 families.

Kuzaran is home to the Kurdish Sanjâbi tribe.

References

Populated places in Kermanshah County
Cities in Kermanshah Province
Kurdish settlements in Kermanshah Province